Aïn Touta is a town in eastern Algeria. It is located 35 km southwest of Batna and 82 km north of Biskra. It has an area of about five square kilometers (2 square miles).

Aïn Touta is one of the interesting cities in Algeria because of its strategic location; it passes upon it the national road number 3 and making this city more active between other cities.

There are four lycées, seven middle schools, hospital, car market, multi-sports hall, two stadiums and more base structures. It exists also a train gare which is considered the biggest gare during the colonial period - France.

Concerning population, the throne of Ouled Sidi Yahia occupies the first place not only in this city but also in Batna the capital and Tazoult - Lambèse.

Localities  of the commune 
The commune of Aïn Touta  is composed of 5 localities:

References 

Communes of Batna Province
Algeria